Eichhorst is a village and a former municipality in the Mecklenburgische Seenplatte district, in Mecklenburg-Vorpommern, Germany. It has formed part of the town of Friedland since 25 May 2014.

Former municipalities in Mecklenburg-Western Pomerania